Sunilduth Lyna Narayanan (born 10 January 1998) is an Indian chess player. He earned the title of Grandmaster in 2015 and is the 41st Grandmaster from India. As of April 2022, he is ranked No. 5 in India and No. 73 in the world, with a FIDE rating of 2662.

Early life 
Narayanan was born in Thiruvananthapuram, Kerala. He was trained professionally by former Kerala State Champion P. Sreekumar, and subsequently by International Master Varugeese Koshy.

Career
Narayanan won his first championship, the Kerala State Under 9 Championship, in August 2007. The same day, Kerala got their first Grandmaster, G. N. Gopal. Narayanan was the Under-11 Kerala State Chess champion in 2008, Under 13 State Champion in 2010, State Sub Junior Champion in 2011, State Junior Champion in 2012, and 2nd in State Senior in 2012. Narayanan won the silver medal for the Under 12 category in the Commonwealth Chess Championship which was held in Delhi in May 2010. In that tournament, he drew with Grandmaster Parimarjan Negi and beat WIM Kiran Manisha Mohanthy at age 12. In July 2011, he attended training from Grandmaster Yevgeny Vladimirov at the Chess Camp First Move conducted by Lakshya and Flame School in Pune, Maharashtra.

The first time Narayanan played against a Grandmaster was in January 2010, during the Parsvnath Open Chess Tournament at Delhi, he got a walkover as his first-round opponent and third seed Ehsan Maghami Ghaem failed to turn up on time because of a delayed flight. When asked, Narayanan said, "it is only fair to give him a chance; besides being able to play a GM is a high deal".

Chess career

 2010: Silver in under 16 category in the commonwealth chess championship held in New Delhi.  

 2011: Silver in the national sub junior chess championship held in Chennai. In September 2011, he achieved 7th place in the 41st National junior at Goa.

 2012: Under-16 chess olympiad Turkey. Played on the first board for the Bronze medal-winning Indian team at the Under-16 Chess Olympiad of 2012.Gold in the under-16 in the Commonwealth Chess Championship. 7th in open section.

 2013: 4th position in the 43rd National Junior chess held at Lucknow.

 2014: Gold in the 44th national junior chess held in Pune.

 2015: Best junior in the Thailand open held at Bangkok. Silver in the Asian Junior chess championship held at Bishkek, Kyrgyz republic.

 2016:Bronze medal for World Junior 2016 at Odisha, India. Gold in the Asian junior blitz chess championship. Silver in open section and bronze in Rapid in the Asian juniors.

 2017: Beat world blitz champion Sergey Karjakin in the Aeroflot Blitz championship at Moscow.

 2018: Bronze in Blitz in the 25th Abu Dhabi international chess festival 2018. Bronze in Zurich international open at Zurich, Switzerland in Dec 2018.

 2019: Chess.com Titled Tuesday, defeating a field including Hikaru Nakamura and Wesley So. Champion of the first El llobregate International Chess 2019 held in Catalonia, Spain. He was the third seed, and secured the title following a playoff win over second seed Bartel Mateusz of Poland.
 4th in the Asian continental chess 2019. bronze in the Blitz category there.
 4th in the Commonwealth chess 2019. Qualified for the Chess World Cup 2019. Knocked out of the FIDE World Chess Championship 2019 in the first round after rapid tiebreaks against Anton Gujjaro. Chess Kerala's Checkmate Covid 19 online blitz tournament, scoring 9/10. Contributed the prize money to the Kerala Chief Minister's Distress Relief Fund. Faced Magnus Carlsen in the semi-finals of the Chess24 Banter Blitz Cup.
2021: In August 2021, he finished second in the Riga Technical University Open "A" tournament.
In October 2021, he finished second at ChessMood Open 2021.
2022: First in 1st Grandiscacchi Catholica international open chess 2022.

References

External links
 
 
 

1998 births
Living people
Indian chess players
Chess grandmasters